R353 road may refer to:
 R353 road (Ireland)
 R353 road (South Africa)